KAMAZ-7850 (Platforma-O) is a new unified family of wheeled very heavy load transporters developed by KAMAZ for the Russian Ministry of Defence. It will replace the Belarusian-made MZKT transporter erector launchers that are currently carrying Russian ICBMs.  Platforma-O comprises KAMAZ-7850 16x16 vehicle with a capacity of 85 t, KAMAZ-78509 12x12 with a capacity of 60 t, KAMAZ-78504 8x8 capable for towing of a 90 t semi-trailer, and KAMAZ-78508 8x8 for the transportation of aircraft on airfields. One of the applications will be carrying RS-24 Yars missiles. State tests were completed in August 2018 and it entered service in March 2019. The Russian military is to receive five versions of the vehicle, namely, 8x8, 12x12 and 16x16 heavy transporters with payload capacities of 25 t, 50 t, and 85 t, respectively, an 8x8 semi-trailer with a towing capacity of 165 t, and an 8x8 ballast tractor with a towing capacity of 400 t. The 12x12 and 16x16 tractors will be used as transporter erector launchers, while other vehicles will carry various support systems.

See also

 List of Kamaz vehicles
 MAZ-7917
MAZ-7310
MZKT-79221

References

External links

Military vehicles of Russia
Missile launchers

Military trucks
Wheeled self-propelled rocket launchers
Military vehicles introduced in the 2010s